May Agnes Fleming (pseudonyms, Cousin May Carleton, M. A. Earlie; November 15, 1840 – March 24, 1880) was a Canadian novelist. She was "one of the first Canadians to pursue a highly successful career as a writer of popular fiction."

Biography
May Agnes Early was born in Carleton, West Saint John, in the Colony of New Brunswick, the daughter of Bernard and Mary Early. May Agnes began publishing while studying at school. She married an engineer, John W. Fleming, in 1865. She moved to New York two years after her first novel, Erminie; or The gypsy's vow: a tale of love and vengeance was published there (1863).

Under the pseudonym "Cousin May Carleton", she published several serial tales in the New York Mercury and the New York Weekly. Twenty-one were printed in book form, seven posthumously. She also wrote under the pseudonym, "M.A. Earlie". The exact count is unclear, since her works were often retitled, but is estimated at around 40, although some were not actually written by her, but were attributed to her by publishers cashing in on her popularity. At her peak, she was earning over $10,000 yearly, due to publishers granting her exclusive rights to her work.

She died in Brooklyn, of Bright's disease.

Selected works
 Silver Star; Or, The Mystery of Fontelle Hall: A Tale of New Jersey in the Olden Time (1861)
 The Queen of the Isle, Or, Sybil Campbell (1861) A.K.A. An Awful Mystery; or Sybil Campbell, the Queen of the Isle. A.K.A. The Queen of the Isle, Or, Sybil Campbell
 Victoria; Or, The Heiress of Castle Cliff (1862)
 The Baronet's Bride; Or, A Woman's Vengeance (1868)
 Magdalen's Vow (1871)
 Guy Earlscourt's Wife (1873)
 A Wonderful Woman (1873)
 A Terrible Secret (1874)
 A Mad Marriage (1875)
 The Midnight Queen (1876)
 Kate Danton; Or, Captain Danton's Daughters (1876)
 Silent and True; Or, A Little Queen (1877)
 The Heir of Charlton (1878)
 Carried by Storm; Or, Sleaford's Joanna (1878)
 The Three Cousins; Or, Life at Hinton Hall (1878)
 Lost for a Woman (1880)
 A Wife's Tragedy (1881)
 The Unseen Bridegroom; Or, Wedded for a Week (1881)
 Sharing Her Crime (1882)
 A Wronged Wife (1883)
 Sir Noel's Heir (1887)
 Who Wins; Or, The Secret of Monkswood Waste (1895)
 The Actress' Daughter (1895)

References

External links

 
 
 
 
 May Agnes Fleming at Open Library
 
 
 

1840 births
1880 deaths
19th-century Canadian novelists
19th-century Canadian short story writers
19th-century Canadian women writers
19th-century pseudonymous writers
Canadian crime fiction writers
Canadian expatriate writers in the United States
Canadian women novelists
Canadian women short story writers
Deaths from nephritis
Dime novelists
Pseudonymous women writers
Women crime writers
Writers from Saint John, New Brunswick